Yuan Sijun (Chinese: 袁思俊; born 29 May 2000) is a Chinese professional snooker player.

Career
Yuan started to play snooker at the age of 10 and played as a wildcard in many professional tournaments between ages of 13 and 16. Yuan first drew attention in 2016 when, at the age of 15, he defeated world number 13 Martin Gould in a 5–0 whitewash in the opening round of the 2016 China Open before losing 2–5 to Graeme Dott. Remarkably, when he again faced Martin Gould in the 2016 Shanghai Masters in October 2016, he produced the same result, a 5–0 win.

In 2015, Yuan entered the 2015 ACBS Asian Under-21 Snooker Championship where he reached the final, but lost eventually to Akani Songsermsawad. Two years later, Yuan once again made it to the final, where he defeated Fan Zhengyi 6–2 to win the Asian Under-21 Championship; as a result, he was given a two-year card on the professional World Snooker Tour for the 2017–18 and 2018–19 seasons. Yuan began the 2017–18 as the youngest player on the professional tour.

2017/2018 season 
Yuan's first match as a professional was a narrow loss to Oliver Lines in the 2017 Riga Masters qualifiers on 31 May 2017, two days after his 17th birthday. His first win was a 4–2 defeat of Allan Taylor in the European Masters qualifiers. Yuan's best wins were 4–1 against Joe Perry in the English Open (which included two centuries), and 5–4 against Shaun Murphy in the Shanghai Masters. In the World Championship, he beat Fergal O'Brien 10–5, before losing 10–9 to Matthew Stevens, despite leading 9-7 and missing several chances to win. In total Yuan managed only 8 wins in his first season, and ended the season ranked 92.

2018/2019 season 
With wins over Ricky Walden, Alexander Ursenbacher, Ding Junhui and Mark King, Yuan reached his first quarter-final at the China Championship, before losing to World No.1 Mark Selby. For the next few months, he progressed steadily, beating the likes of Mark Allen and Kyren Wilson. In the German Masters, he beat 4-time World Champion John Higgins 5–4 on the final black, somewhat controversially as the cue-ball appeared to touch the rest (a foul stroke) after the players had shaken hands.

Yuan's solid results in the first half of the 2018/19 season lifted him into the top-32 on the 1-year rankings, thus qualifying for the World Grand Prix in Cheltenham. He beat World Champion Mark Williams 4-3 and Stephen Maguire 4–2 to reach his second quarter-final, losing to flatmate Xiao Guodong 5–4.

Just shy of his 19th birthday, Yuan made remarkable progress in the 2018/19 season. He attracted praise from commentators Jimmy White, Ronnie O'Sullivan and Stephen Hendry, who described him as 'one of the best youngsters since the likes of Ding Junhui, Ronnie O'Sullivan, Mark Williams, or John Higgins'.

2019/2020 season 
In the International Championship Yuan suffered an agonising loss on the final black to Shaun Murphy 6–5, despite making 8 breaks over 50. This contributed to a loss of form, reaching the last 16 only once, in the Northern Ireland Open. With the arrival of COVID-19, the snooker season was suspended. Yuan Sijun returned to Nanchang, but was unable to play snooker due to lockdown restrictions. He did not return for the rescheduled World Championship.

2020/2021 season 
Yuan Sijun returned from China after the COVID-19 suspension in September 2020, having not picked up a cue for 6 months. This contributed to a poor season. Yuan's most notable achievement was reaching the third round of the Northern Ireland Open, beating close friend Luo Honghao and Tom Ford before eventually losing 4–0 to Ding Junhui.

In the World Championship he lost his first match by 6–5 to Rod Lawler, missing a simple pink in the final frame. This loss meant that he was relegated from the tour.

2021/2022 season 
Yuan Sijun entered Q School to try to regain his tour card. He was successful in Event 1, beating Mitchell Mann 4–2 in the final match.

Yuan's best result of 2021-22 was a 3rd round appearance in the European Masters, beating Stuart Carrington and Ricky Walden, before losing to Liang Wenbo. He also scored wins over Matt Selt, Barry Hawkins and Mark Davis. At the World Championship, he reached the final qualifying round for the first time, with 6-3 wins over Ross Muir and Steven Hallworth, a 6–1 win over Ryan Day, before losing 10–7 to Liam Highfield. Yuan finished the season ranked 68. Along with several other Chinese players, Yuan did not return to China during the summer break.

2022/2023 season 
The first tournament of the 2022–23 season was the Summer Championship League. Yuan Sijun won his first round group, against Barry Hawkins, Ken Doherty and Lei Peifan, without losing a frame. In the second round group, he continued this run by beating World Champion Ronnie O'Sullivan 3–0. But 2-2 draws against Ali Carter and Pang Junxu meant he finished 2nd in the group.

Personal life
At the start of the 2018/2019 season, Yuan Sijun moved to Darlington and is based at the Q House Academy, managed by Chusak Phetmalaikul. In 2020, he moved to the newly opened Ding Junhui Snooker Academy in Sheffield.

Performance and rankings timeline

Career finals

Pro-am finals: 1 (1 title)

Amateur finals: 2 (1 title)

References

External links
Yuan Sijun at worldsnooker.com
Yuan Sijun at CueTracker.net: Snooker Results and Statistic Database

Chinese snooker players
Living people
2000 births
People from Nanchang
Sportspeople from Jiangxi
21st-century Chinese people